Zhang Jingchu (born 2 February 1980) is a Chinese film actress. Zhang is best known for winning the China Film Media Award Best Actress award for the 2005 film Peacock, which was shown at the Berlin International Film Festival.

Early life 
Zhang was born on 2 February 1980 in Fujian, China. Zhang was brought up in a middle-class family in the countryside.

Education 
Zhang studied English in Beijing New Oriental Institute, a private language  educational school in Beijing, China. Zhang graduated in Directing from Central Academy of Drama in Beijing, China.

Career
Zhang's acting career began in both film and television in 2000. In 2005, she transitioned into an international films. Zhang came into international prominence through director Gu Changwei's debut film Peacock, which won the Silver Bear at the 2005 Berlin International Film Festival. She was picked from 1,000 applicants for her role as a petulant, conniving homebound daughter who tries to chart her own course in life. Following which, she got a role in Tsui Hark's martial arts film Seven Swords, which opened the Venice Film Festival in August 2005.

Zhang shed her gentle and quiet image to play the rebellious and gutsy protagonist in 
Huayao Bride in Shangri-la (2005), and won the Beijing College Student Film Festival for Best Actress. She was named one of "Asia's Heroes" by Time magazine.

In 2006, Zhang was cast as the tough-talking heroine in the Finnish-Chinese kungfu movie Jade Warrior, directed by A. J. Annila. The same year, she starred in romantic drama The Road directed by Lu Chuan. Zhang won over the audience with the maturity she shows in her acting, and her extraordinary ability to touch hearts by interpreting the different stages of a Chinese woman's life. She won the Best Actress award at the 30th Cairo International Film Festival.

Zhang then starred in Derek Yee's drug smuggling film Protégé (2007). Her portrayal of a woman who is forced to struggle between drug addiction and herself won praises from both the audience and critics. The same year, she made her Hollywood film debut in Rush Hour 3 alongside Jackie Chan.

Zhang worked with German director Florian Gallenberger in the film John Rabe (2008), where she plays a college student whose family suffers in the Japanese invasion of Nanjing.

She then starred in Ann Hui's film Night and Fog, a social commentary film which sheds light on Hong Kong immigrants from China. Her portrayal of the protagonist Ling, a woman who struggles with an abusive husband won rave reviews from critics and was described as a "turning point" in her career. The same year, she starred in Red River where she played a mentally-challenged Vietnamese girl.

Zhang next starred in Feng Xiaogang's disaster film Aftershock (2010), playing a girl who separates from her mother after the Tangshan earthquake and becomes a rescue worker. Zhang also takes part in earthquake relief efforts in real life. She is the ambassador of the charity SiyuanAOC Rainbow Plan, founded by China Siyuan Foundation for Poverty Alleviation and AOC Monitor.

Zhang then took a six-month break from the entertainment industry, stating that she was disappointed by the commercial nature of her recent roles. During this time, she served as a jury member at the Shanghai International Film Festival. She returned to the screen in the romantic comedy Laucana (2012) co-starring Shawn Yue.

In 2013, she starred in the action thriller Switch alongside Andy Lau. She also starred in the Italian film The Mercury Factor alongside Luca Barbareschi. In April 2013, Zhang was on location in Jerusalem, where she starred in The Old Cinderella. Since China and Israel established diplomatic relations, this was the first joint film project.
Zhang next featured in Mission: Impossible – Rogue Nation (2015). The same year, she was cast in the film adaptation of the best-selling novel, The Three-Body Problem.

In 2017, Zhang was cast in the thriller film Once Upon a Time in Northeast China; as well as crime action film Wings Over Everest.

Filmography

Film

Television series

Awards

References

External links
Sina Blog of Zhang Jingchu 

1980 births
Living people
Actresses from Fujian
Chinese television actresses
People from Sanming
Central Academy of Drama alumni
Chinese stage actresses
20th-century Chinese actresses
21st-century Chinese actresses
Chinese film actresses

kk:Чжан Цзыи